Kalipada Ghoshal (Bengali: কালিপদ ঘোষাল; September 1906 – 29 April 1995) (Kalipada means he who is under Mother Goddess Kali). He was an artist from Calcutta. He was a well regarded student of the Indian Society of Oriental Art and a member of Abanindranath Tagore's Bengal school of art.

List of paintings
Wash and Tempera
 Shakuntala (1922) Collector: Governor General Lord Reading
 Floral Presentation (Pushpa-upahar) (1922) Collector: Gaganendranath Tagore
 Vyas Guhaye Shankaracharya Meditating Saint Shankaracharya in cave (1927)
 JolSawa (Hindu Religious Practice on Auspicious Occasions (Hindu Marriages) (1928) Size: 20'x6'
 Shri Chaitanyer Abhishar (1928) Size: 10'x6' Collector: India House London
 Prashadhan of Shri Krishna (1928) Large Painting 10'x12'
 Persian Queen (Persian Night) Collector: Benito Mussolini's Daughter, Italy
 Shiva Parvati - Haro Parbati (1938)
 Wash Painting Shiva Durga (1942) Size: 11'x7' Collector: Rabindrabharati Museum
 Dushmanta Shakuntala (1943) Collector: Delhi Museum
 Ramer Samudrapuja Collector: Madras Museum
 Evening Toilet (Beauty Spa) Collector: Mumbai Museum
 Floral Character - Shephali Collector: Lucknow Museum
 Shiva Durga Collector: Bardwan Bardhaman Maharaja
  Tripura Shundari. Indian Folk Dance Saotal Nritya (Santal Dance) (1942–19) Collector: Tripura Royal Family
 Blooming Floral Beauty of Women (Prashphutita) Collector: Lord Jackson
 Pandavas Journey (Pandaber Mahaprashthan) Collector: N.C.Chatterjee, Kolkara
 Worshiping Devdashi (Natir Puja) Collector: Kamal Singha Roy of Amta Howrah.
 Saint Gautam Buddha with His Son Rahul . Collector Kanailala Sarbadhikari.
 Hindu Religious Goddess Maha Laxmi Collector: B.K. Saha of Radha Bazar Kolkata.
 Shatir Dehotyaag (1972) Collector : Rabindrabharati Museum
 Buddha (1972)
 Damayanti (1928)
 Series on Buddha
 Series on Krishna
 Series on Indian Ragas Raginis and on Hindustani Religious historical culture.

References 

 Jugantar – Article on Arts,19 September 1937, Page19.
 SARAVAT (Sarashwat), Volume:02.No:03, November to January,1969.R.N.16601/68. Page 319.
 University of Calcutta employees annual magazine - 3rd Year,1st Issue, 1989, Pages 83 – 85.
 Rabindra Bharati University Museum Art Gallery Catalogue, 23 May 1980.
 The Statesman (Calcutta Pressmedia) "The Arts" column, 27 May 1980.

1906 births
Indian male painters
People from Howrah
Bengali Hindus
Bengali male artists
20th-century Indian painters
Painters from West Bengal
1995 deaths
20th-century Indian male artists